William Ermested (died 31 October 1558) was a Canon of Windsor from 1554 – 1558 and Master of the Temple.

Having previously graduated M.A. at a university abroad, Ermested was incorporated at Oxford on 12 December 1527, and graduated B.D. on 12 December 1527, later advancing to D.D.

Career
He was appointed:
Rector of Fryerning, Essex, 1533
Vicar of Birstall, West Yorkshire, 1535
Rector of Adel, West Yorkshire, 1536
Prebendary of Neasden at St Paul's Cathedral, 1539–1558
Rector of Kislingbury, Northamptonshire, 1542–1558
Vicar of All Saints' Church, Northampton, 1545–1550
Master of the Temple

He re-founded Ermysted's Grammar School in Skipton in 1548.

He was appointed to the twelfth stall in St George's Chapel, Windsor Castle in 1554, and held the stall until 1558.

References

1558 deaths
Canons of Windsor
Masters of the Temple
Year of birth missing